Dương Minh Châu is a township of Dương Minh Châu District, Tây Ninh Province, Vietnam.

References

Populated places in Tây Ninh province
District capitals in Vietnam
Townships in Vietnam